The Paper Tiger catamaran is a class of yacht. There are Paper Tiger fleets around Australia and New Zealand. Regular State, National and International Championships are conducted.

Specifications
Length overall 
Beam 
Sail area 
Mast 
Weight rigged (approximate) 
Min. Hull Weight (unrigged)

References

1. http://www.papertigercatamaran.org/

External links
Australian Paper Tiger Catamaran Association
New Zealand Paper Tiger Owners Association
Victorian Paper Tiger Catamaran Association

Catamarans